The North Group was an intellectual community comprising various writers, artists, philosophers, politicians, and intellectuals from Northern Peru, especially from the La Libertad Region. It was founded in 1915 in the city of Trujillo. At first known as the "Bohemians of Trujillo," the community adopted the name "the North Group" in 1923.  Early leaders included journalist Antenor Orrego and poet José Eulogio Garrido. Its most prominent members included poet Cesar Vallejo, politician Victor Raul Haya de la Torre, Alcides Spelucín, Macedonio de la Torre, Juan Espejo Asturrizaga, Francisco Xandóval, and Ciro Alegría. This group inspired the work of Eduardo González Viaña, one of its modern successors. 

The North Group was started in order to create artistic and social renewal during the time of global cultural crisis that occurred after the First World War. It was extremely important to the cultural development of Peru, and several of its members were prominent in the fields of literature, philosophy, and social action at the national and international levels.

History

The North Group, which brought together young students from the National University of Trujillo, was initially led by animator, writer, and philosopher Antenor Orrego. As the author of several books and as the editor of a newspaper and magazine, he led the group in opposition to another trujillano intellectual group, led by the poet Victor Alejandro Hernandez, which was considered to be more traditional and aristocratic. The North Group's purpose, as made explicit later in the prologue to Orrego Trilce (Vallejo poems), was to enhance the "culture and the mental elevation of Trujillo".
 
The Group adopted the name "Bohemians of Trujillo" following an article written by the poet Juan Parra in Lima magazine (22 October 1916). Parra, who was warmly received on a recent visit to Trujillo, wrote of his admiration for the literary group, calling it by that name. He praised, among others, the poet Vallejo, citing one of his verses.

Members
Representative members of the group and its successors include the following:
 César Vallejo, poet and educator
 Víctor Raúl Haya de la Torre, journalist and political leader
 Eduardo González Viaña, novelist and journalist
 José Eulogio Garrido, poet
 Antenor Orrego, writer, journalist and philosopher
 Alcides Spelucín, poet
 Macedonio de la Torre, painter, sculptor and musician
 Eloy Espinoza, poet
 Óscar Imaña, poet
 Federico Esquerre
 Julio Esquerre
 Belisario Espelucín
 Juan Espejo Asturrizaga, poet and educator
 Francisco Xandóval, poet
 Alfonso Sánchez Arteaga (Camilo Blas), painter
 Carlos Manuel Cox, political leader
 Carlos Valderrama Herrera, musician
 Domingo Parra del Riego
 Juan José Lora, poet
 Jorge Eugenio Castañeda Peralta, Doctor of Laws
 Francisco Dañino
 Manuel Vásquez Díaz
 Néstor Alegría
 José Agustín Haya de la Torre
 Crisólogo Quesada
 Daniel Hoyle, musician
 Alfredo Rebaza Acosta, educator
 Ciro Alegría, novelist and journalist
 Luis Sánchez Ferrer, political leader
 Gerardo Chávez, artist
 Pedro Azabache Bustamante, painter

See also
La Libertad Region
Trujillo, Peru

References

Selected works available in English
The Black Heralds (Translator: Rebecca Seiferle) Copper Canyon Press 
Trilce (Translator: Dave Smith) Mishima Books. 
Autopsy on Surrealism (Translator: Richard Schaaf) Curbstone Press.

Further reading 
English:
César Vallejo: A Critical Bibliography of Research, Stephen M Hart, 2002
César Vallejo: The Dialectics of Poetry and Silence, Jean Franco, 1976
The Catastrophe of Modernity: Tragedy and the Nation in Latin American Literature, Patrick Dove, 2004
The Poem on the Edge of the Word: the Limits of Language and the Uses of Silence, D.C. Niebylski, 1993

Spanish:Recordando a Vallejo: La Bohemia de Trujillo / Luis Alva Castro, Luis. www.Tribuna-us.com
Ensayos vallejianos / William Rowe., 2006
César Vallejo al pie del orbe / Iván Rodríguez Chávez., 2006
Alcance filosófico en Cesar Vallejo y Antonio Machado / Antonio Belaunde Moreyra., 2005

External links

Human Potential: The Life and Work of César Vallejo
Information about Vallejo from the Academy of American Poets
Griffin Poetry Prize biography, including audio and video clips of Guillermo Verdecchia reading Clayton Eshleman's translation of Vallejo's Guitar
Interview with Vallejo, the only extant interview with Vallejo, 1931.